Alexandru Roman (born 1895, date of death unknown) was a Romanian tennis player. He competed in the men's singles and doubles events at the 1924 Summer Olympics.

References

External links
 

1895 births
Year of death missing
Romanian male tennis players
Olympic tennis players of Romania
Tennis players at the 1924 Summer Olympics
Place of birth missing